Ethel Scott (1907–1984) was the first black woman to represent Great Britain in an international athletics competition.  She was a sprinter active in international competitions for a brief period in the 1930s.  In general, Scott's achievements are only thinly documented, and she is largely unknown to the British public and historians of sport.

Athletics career
While many details of Scott’s athletics career are unknown, short-distance track events such as the 60 metre sprint and the 4x100 metre relay were her specialties.  She is known to have competed between 1928 and 1950, and achieved her greatest successes around 1930.

On 30 August 1930, Scott set a personal best for the 60 metres at a track meet in Mitcham, London.  Her time of 7.8 seconds was 2 tenths of a second off the world record of 7.6 seconds; it equalled the current British record, which had been set in 1922 by Mary Lines.  Scott is 39th on a list of the top performers in this event before 1940.

Her best time for the 100 metres was also set in 1930, although it was unconfirmed.  She obtained a time of 11.1 seconds at a meet in Arras, France.  If confirmed, this would have been close to a world record for the time.

Scott is believed to have competed with the Middlesex Ladies' Athletics Club; a club badge featuring the characteristic three swords motif and the initials MLAC survives amongst her memorabilia.  Her club affiliation is also confirmed by a brief reference in The Times from 1930. Scott also competed in a number of athletic events organised by the Civil Service; she claimed to have won the 100m sprint sponsored by the Ministry of Labour four years in a row.

In a photograph, taken in 1929, Scott appears in her MLAC uniform surrounded by the fruits of her athletic career: at least six medals, four trophies, and other prizes including a tea set.  The oldest surviving prize is a set of fish knives and forks in a box marked 'E.Scott 1st 100 yards 1928'.  Her last medal is for the WAAA Relay in 1950.  Many of her awards were lost when the family home was destroyed in a German air raid during 1940, including her silver medal from the Women's World Games.

International competitions

The highlight of Scott's athletic career came in September 1930, when she was one of fifteen athletes chosen to represent Britain at the third Women's World Games in Prague.  The Women's World Games were created by Alice Milliat as an alternative to the Olympics, which at that time included only a limited program of events for women.

According to The Times, Ethel Scott competed in the 60m sprint and the 4x100 relay.  She won her heat in the first round of the 60 metre sprint on 6 September, beating Lisa Gelius of Germany in dramatic photo finish in front of an audience of 15,000.  However, she made little impression in the final on the following day, finishing out of the top six places.  Her competitors included many of the most successful sprinters of the pre-1940 era: Stella Walasiewicz (POL), Lisa Gelius (GER), Kinue Hitomi (JAP), Ivy Walker (GB) and Marguerite Radideau (FRA).

The British 4x100 relay team, consisting of Ethel Scott, Ivy Walker, Eileen Hiscock and Daisy Ridgley, was more successful. The team completed their qualifying heat on 7 September in 49.7 seconds, and took the silver medal in the final the following day despite a time of 50.5 seconds.

After the completion of the Women’s World Games, Scott and Ivy Walker travelled on to Berlin for another track meet, where they competed with two other British women as the “London Team”.   The others were F. Latham and Muriel Gunn-Cornell.  This combination performed even better at Berlin, obtaining a time of 49.3 seconds in the 4x100 relay on 13 September 1930.

Scott did not take part in either of the 1928 or 1932 Olympics; nor does she appear to have participated in the 1934 Women's World Games or the Empire Games, both held in London.  Scott did attend the 1938 European Athletics Championships in Vienna, which included women's events for the first time. Her surviving memorabilia includes a competitor's bracelet, featuring the flags of all the competing nations, including Nazi Germany.  However, Scott is not listed in contemporary newspaper coverage as a competitor, which suggests she may have attended in a coaching or supporting role.

Personal life

Scott was born on 22 October 1907; she was the daughter of Jane (née Pilgrim) and David Emmanuel Scott.  She had two brothers, Richard Walter and George Alexander, and one sister, Margery Gladys.  Her father served in the Royal Naval Volunteer Reserve during World War I, but was killed in an accident on HMS Hogue in August 1914, at age 49. After his death Ethel, Richard and Margery lived with their mother Jane, until her death in 1951, they lived in Upton Park, London and Leigh-on-Sea, Essex.  She worked in the Civil Service and as a Medical Secretary until her retirement.  Ethel Scott never married or had children and she died in 1984.

References

External links
 Athlete profile from site Track and Field Statistics

1907 births
1984 deaths
Black British sportswomen
British female sprinters